Timofei Aleksandrovich Dokschitzer (13 December 1921, Nizhyn, Ukraine — 16 March 2005, Vilnius) was a Soviet Russian trumpeter, and a professor in Gnesins Musical College. He was the solo trumpeter of the Bolshoi Theater.

He started to play when he was 10 years old. He finished the Central Musical School and Gnesins Musical College. In 1947 he won the International Competition in Prague. In 1957 he finished the Moscow State Conservatory. He became one of the outstanding trumpeters of the world, who proved that trumpet can be a solo instrument, as the violin or piano.

He played both classical musical compositions and modern concertos by Alexander Arutiunian and others. Some of his records were re-issued on CD.

His very distinctive style and sound was born out of a love of opera, and that operatic influence remained a permanent element of his playing.

At the International Trumpet Days Bremen, Germany he gave each year masterclasses from 1992 - 1999 and was professor at the International Trumpet Academy Bremen, Germany from 1994 - 1999 together with international trumpeters like Pierre Thibaud (France), Bo Nilsson (Sweden), Otto Sauter (Germany).

External links 
 Timofei Dokchitser
 Interview with Timofei Dokschitzer by Bruce Duffie, June 1, 1995

1921 births
2005 deaths
Russian classical trumpeters
Russian musicians
Soviet musicians
Russian people of Ukrainian descent
People from Nizhyn
Academic staff of Gnessin State Musical College
20th-century classical musicians
20th-century trumpeters